The 2012 Collingwood Football Club season is the club's 116th season of senior competition in the Australian Football League (AFL). The club also fielded its reserves team in the VFL.

Squad
 Players are listed by guernsey number, and 2012 statistics are for AFL regular season and finals series matches during the 2012 AFL season only. Career statistics include a player's complete AFL career, which, as a result, means that a player's debut and part or whole of their career statistics may be for another club. Statistics are correct as of 2nd Preliminary Final of the 2012 season (21 September 2012) and are taken from AFL Tables.

Squad changes

In

Out

Season summary

Pre-season matches

Regular season

Finals series

Ladder

Awards & Milestones

AFL Awards
 Anzac Medal – Dane Swan (Round 5)
 Member of the 2012 All-Australian team (left-wing) – Dayne Beams
 Member of the 2012 All-Australian team (interchange) – Scott Pendlebury
 Member of the 2012 All-Australian team (interchange) – Dane Swan

AFL Award Nominations
 Round 7 – 2012 AFL Mark of the Year nomination – Heath Shaw
 Round 8 – 2012 AFL Goal of the Year nomination – Scott Pendlebury
 Round 8 – 2012 AFL Mark of the Year nomination – Travis Cloke
 Round 11 – 2012 AFL Mark of the Year nomination – Sharrod Wellingham
 Round 13 – 2012 AFL Mark of the Year nomination – Jamie Elliott

Milestones
 Round 1 – Jackson Paine (AFL debut)
 Round 1 – Paul Seedsman (AFL debut)
 Round 1 – Peter Yagmoor (AFL debut)
 Round 1 – Travis Cloke (150 games)
 Round 1 – Dale Thomas (100 goals)
 Round 2 – Chris Dawes (50 games)
 Round 2 – Luke Ball (50 Collingwood games)
 Round 5 – Kirk Ugle (AFL debut)
 Round 9 – Jamie Elliott (AFL debut)
 Round 9 – Marley Williams (AFL debut)
 Round 11 – Darren Jolly (50 Collingwood games)
 Round 11 – Sharrod Wellingham (50 goals)
 Round 14 – Caolan Mooney (AFL debut)
 Round 16 – Jarryd Blair (50 games)
 Round 16 – Alan Toovey (100 games)
 Round 16 – Harry O'Brien (150 games)
 Round 23 – Heath Shaw (150 games)
 1st Qualifying Final – Dale Thomas (150 games)
 1st Semi-Final – Jarryd Blair (50 goals)

VFL season

Pre-season matches

Regular season

Ladder

Notes
 Key
 H ^ Home match.
 A ^ Away match.

 Notes
 Collingwood's scores are indicated in bold font.

References

External links
 Official website of the Collingwood Football Club
 Official website of the Australian Football League

2012
Collingwood Football Club